The women's 4 x 100 metres relay at the 2011 IPC Athletics World Championships was held at the QEII Stadium on 24 and 28 January 2011.

Medalists

References
Complete Results Book from the 2011 IPC Athletics World Championships
Official site of the 2011 IPC Athletics World Championships

4 x 100 metres relay
2011 in women's athletics
4 × 100 metres relay at the World Para Athletics Championships